Trichodes zaharae is a beetle species of checkered beetles belonging to the family Cleridae, subfamily Clerinae. It was described by Louis Alexandre Auguste Chevrolat in 1861 and is endemic to Spain.

References

zaharae
Beetles described in 1861
Endemic fauna of Spain